Klein Letaba River is a tributary of the Letaba River, situated in Limpopo, South Africa. After its confluence with the Groot Letaba River on the western boundary of the Kruger National Park it forms the Letaba River flowing through the whole width of the park.

The Klein Letaba tributaries like the Soeketse River and Koedoes River are wide, dry and sandy ditches for most of the year.

See also
Letaba River
Groot Letaba River
List of reservoirs and dams in South Africa

Rivers of Limpopo